"Giri Giri Chop" is the twenty-sixth single by B'z, released on June 9, 1999. This song is one of B'z many number-one singles in Oricon chart. "Giri Giri Chop" was used as the sixth opening song for Detective Conan and the song "One" was also used as the theme song for third Detective Conan movie, The Last Wizard of the Century. It became the best selling opening single in the Detective Conan series, with 805,000 units.

Track listing 

One

Certifications

References 
B'z performance at Oricon

External links
B'z official website

1999 singles
1999 songs
B'z songs
Case Closed songs
Oricon Weekly number-one singles
Songs written by Tak Matsumoto
Songs written by Koshi Inaba